Metasphenisca ghenti is a species of tephritid or fruit flies in the genus Metasphenisca of the family Tephritidae.

Distribution
Zimbabwe, South Africa.

References

Tephritinae
Insects described in 1947
Diptera of Africa